Awsumb is a Norwegian toponymic surname. It is derived from an ancient farm in Vinger, Norway. The spelling Awsumb is an anglicization of Aasumb used by some Norwegian emigrants to the United States. The Old Norse farm name Aasumb consists of the words for ridge (ås) and home (umb). Aasumb is an older, variant form of Åsum, which is a common surname and place name in Scandinavia.

People with the surname 
 George Awsumb (1880–1959), architect
 Gwen Robinson Awsumb (1915–2003), politician
 Roger Awsumb (1928–2002), children's television personality

References

See also 
Åsum (disambiguation)

Toponymic surnames
Norwegian-language surnames